Michals is a patronymic surname meaning "son of Michael (or Michal)" . There are other spellings. The given name Michal is common amongst Czechs.

Persons with the surname
 Duane Michals (b. 1932), American photographer
 Mark Michals (b. ?), American drummer for band Faster Pussycat
 William Michals (b. 1965), American stage actor and baritone singer

See also
 Michal
 Michaels
 Michels

Patronymic surnames